John Blaikie (born 28 December 1973 in Hamilton, New Zealand) is a retired rugby union footballer.

Playing career

A hard-working, reliable lock, Blaikie attended Otago Boys' High School and quickly moved into the Otago provincial side. He made his debut for the Highlanders in 1997, and was a regular starter by 1998.

Through the Highlanders most successful period from 1998 to 2002, Blaikie was a fixture in the line-up, and was a member of the team that reached the 1999 Super 12 Final. In 1999 and 2000, he was a teammate of his brother Duncan, who was a loose forward for the squad.

Although he was selected to New Zealand A squads, he was never selected to the All Blacks.

In 2002, Blaikie moved to FC Grenoble in France, where he spent three seasons before retiring from professional rugby. Following his retirement, he attended Cambridge University and played for the varsity squad.

External links
 1999 Profile

1973 births
Living people
New Zealand rugby union players
Rugby union locks
Highlanders (rugby union) players
University of Otago alumni
Rugby union players from Hamilton, New Zealand